Worsthorne-with-Hurstwood is a civil parish in the borough of Burnley, Lancashire, England.  The parish contains 22 buildings that are recorded in the National Heritage List for England as designated listed buildings. Of these, four are listed at Grade II*, the middle grade, and the others are at Grade II, the lowest grade.  Apart from the village of Worsthorne and the settlement of Hurstwood, the parish is rural.  Most of the listed buildings are farmhouses, or originated as farmhouses or farm buildings.  Other listed buildings include large houses and associated structures, a row of former back-to-back cottages, a church, and a telephone kiosk.

Key

Buildings

References

Citations

Sources

Buildings and structures in Burnley
Lists of listed buildings in Lancashire